Governor Miller may refer to:

Benjamin M. Miller (1864–1944), 39th Governor of Alabama
Bob Miller (Nevada governor) (born 1945), 26th Governor of Nevada
Charles R. Miller (politician) (1857–1927), 54th Governor of Delaware
James Miller (general) (1776–1851), 1st Governor of Arkansas Territory
John Miller (North Dakota politician) (1843–1908), 1st Governor of North Dakota
John Miller (Missouri politician) (1781–1846), 4th Governor of Missouri
John P. Miller (naval officer), Acting Naval Governor of Guam
Keith Harvey Miller (1925–2019), 3rd Governor of Alaska
Leslie A. Miller (1886–1970), 17th Governor of Wyoming
Nathan L. Miller (1868–1953), 43rd Governor of New York
Stephen Miller (Minnesota governor) (1816–1881), 4th Governor of Minnesota
Stephen Decatur Miller (1787–1838), 52nd Governor of South Carolina
Thomas Miller (North Carolina governor) (died 1685), 7th Governor of Albemarle Sound
Walter Dale Miller (1925–2015), 29th Governor of South Dakota
William Miller (North Carolina politician) (1783–1825), 18th Governor of North Carolina
William Read Miller (1823–1887), 12th Governor of Arkansas
Zell Miller (1932–2018), 79th Governor of Georgia